Bareback Ride is the second album by the American alternative rock band Walt Mink, released in 1993. Sales and acclaim for the album fell short of the band's first album, Miss Happiness, which was released the previous year.

Bareback Ride was the last album with the original band lineup of John Kimbrough, Candice Belanoff and Joey Waronker.

Critical reception
Entertainment Weekly wrote: "Astonishingly derivative of ’60s Brit-pop (the Kinks at their most cloying) and ’70s prog-rock (don’t ask), Walt Mink can’t be serious, and that’s the trio’s appeal." The Washington Post wrote that "these 10 songs are pithy -- there's not a 10-minute drum solo to be found -- and [John] Kimbrough's wispy voice recalls the feyness of neo-psychedelic pop bands like the Three O'Clock." Billboard praised the band's "keen sense of melody and dynamic instrumental punch." Trouser Press thought that "Kimbrough weaves a simple, busy web of guitar, roaring just as loudly but concentrating his efforts into metallic vignettes rather than functionally stable textures."

Track listing 
All songs written by John Kimbrough.
 "Subway" – 2:18
 "Shine" – 4:06
 "Zero Day" – 1:58
 "Disappear" – 2:48
 "Sunnymede" – 3:49
 "Frail" – 3:41
 "Turn" – 2:30
 "Fragile" – 3:02
 "What a Day" – 2:59
 "Tree in Orange" – 3:31

Personnel 
John Kimbrough – guitar, vocals
Candice Belanoff – bass guitar, backing vocals
Joey Waronker – drums, percussion

That Dog – additional voices & strings
Stuart Wylen – flute notes
Brian Foxworthy – engineer
Mike Augustinelli – assistant engineer
Ezra Gold – engineer on "Sunnymede"
John Agnello – mix

References

External links
 "Releases" page on Walt Mink's official site @ The Internet Archive (includes lyrics)

1993 albums
Walt Mink albums